The National Museum of Subaquatic Archaeology in Cartagena (Murcia), Spain is an underwater archaeology museum. It owns a large collection of pieces recovered from shipwrecks that begins in the Phoenician period, and arrives until the 19th century. 

On December 2, 2012, the 14.5 tons cargo of gold and silver coins recovered from the wreck of the frigate Nuestra Señora de las Mercedes was deposited in the museum for cataloging, study and permanent display.

References

1980 establishments in Spain
Archaeological museums in Spain
Buildings and structures in Cartagena, Spain
Cultural tourism in Spain
Maritime archaeology
Museums established in 1980
Museums in the Region of Murcia
National museums of Spain